Khomeyr Mahalleh may refer to:
 Khomeyr Mahalleh, Amlash
 Khomeyr Mahalleh, Langarud
 Khomeyr Mahalleh, Rudsar
 Khomeyr Mahalleh, Kelachay, Rudsar County